ReNeuron is a UK-based stem cell research company whose shares are listed on the Alternative Investment Market. Its focus is on the development of stem-cell therapies targeting areas of poorly-met medical need, including peripheral arterial disease, strokes, and retinal diseases.

ReNeuron is testing the effects of neural stem cells on spinal cords for neuroregeneration. They are also testing the use of fetal stem cells on stroke patients.

References

External links

Biotechnology companies of the United Kingdom
Biotechnology companies established in 1997
1997 establishments in the United Kingdom